Hans Tuppy (born July 22, 1924) is an Austrian biochemist who participated in the sequencing of insulin, and became Austria's first university professor for biochemistry. He was Austrian Minister for Science and Research from 1987 to 1989.

Family background and youth 
Hans Tuppy's parents were from the present day Czech Republic, his mother Emma from Prague and his father Karl from Brünn. Karl Tuppy (Jan. 1, 1880 - Nov. 15, 1939) was chief prosecutor in the trial against those members of the illegal Austrian Nazi party who had murdered chancellor Engelbert Dollfuss during the abortive 1934 July Putsch. After Austria's Anschluss Karl Tuppy was detained and eventually moved to the Sachsenhausen concentration camp, where he was so savagely beaten upon his arrival that he died the following night. While Hans Tuppy's older brother Peter was killed in action as a Wehrmacht soldier in 1944, Hans (who completed secondary school in 1942) was ordered into the Reichsarbeitsdienst but was soon released from duty after suffering a severe injury.

Career
Tuppy's early release from RAD service enabled him to commence studies at the University of Vienna even before World War II had ended in Austria, and to complete the requirements for his diploma  in 1945. His doctoral work was initiated in the laboratory of Professor Ernst Späth. Following Späth's death in 1946, Tuppy worked under the supervision of Friedrich Galinovsky and obtained his Ph.D. degree in 1948.

Shortly thereafter Professor Frederick Wessely, Director of the Chemistry Institute recommended Tuppy to Max Perutz for postdoctoral work at Cambridge University. Perutz, in turn, recommended Tuppy to Frederick Sanger. Thus Tuppy joined Sanger's laboratory at Cambridge where he worked on the amino acid sequence of bovine insulin, sequencing its beta chain. (Sanger was awarded the Nobel Prize in 1958 for sequencing insulin.)

Tuppy's next career step was the Carlsberg Laboratory in Copenhagen, from where he returned to the University of Vienna in 1951 to become an assistant at the Institute for Chemistry II. In 1956 he completed the Habilitation, the highest academic qualification in the Austrian academic system which qualifies the recipient to supervise doctoral students and, ultimately, to hold senior faculty positions. In 1963, Tuppy became Professor of Biochemistry in the Institute of Biochemistry at the University of Vienna. In 1973, he received the Schrödinger Prize of the Austrian Academy of Sciences.

During his distinguished career Professor Tuppy has been President of the Austrian Science Fund (1974-1982), Rector of the University of Vienna (1983-1985), President of the Austria Academy of Sciences (1985-1987) and the Austrian Government Minister for Science and Research (1987-1989) during the chancellorship of Franz Vranitzky. He is chair of the university board of the University of Natural Resources and Applied Life Sciences Vienna (2003–present).

Honours and awards
 Austrian Decoration for Science and Art
 Wilhelm Exner Medal, (1978)
 Ludwig Wittgenstein Prize (Austrian Science Foundation, 2002)
 Member of the Pontifical Academy of Sciences
 Member of the German Academy of Sciences Leopoldina
 Honorary member of the Austrian Neuroscience Association (ANA), inducted at the general assembly 25.9.2017

References

External links 
 Exposition on the life of Hans Tuppy  
 Hans Tuppy. AEIOU  

Austrian biochemists
1924 births
Living people
Members of the European Molecular Biology Organization
Members of the Pontifical Academy of Sciences
Members of the Austrian Academy of Sciences
Schrödinger Prize recipients
Carlsberg Laboratory staff
Recipients of the Austrian Decoration for Science and Art
Rectors of universities in Austria
University of Natural Resources and Life Sciences, Vienna
University of Vienna alumni
Academic staff of the University of Vienna
Austrian people of German Bohemian descent
Austrian people of Moravian-German descent
Scientists from Vienna
20th-century Austrian scientists
20th-century chemists
Reich Labour Service members
Austrian expatriates in the United Kingdom
Austrian expatriates in Denmark